Across the Open Sea is the third studio album by the Swedish death metal band, Unleashed. It was released in 1993 on Century Media Records. It was produced by the band itself.

Track listing
All songs written by Unleashed, unless stated otherwise

Personnel
 Johnny Hedlund – vocals, bass
 Fredrik Lindgren – guitar
 Tomas Olsson – guitar
 Anders Schultz – drums
Guest musicians
 Stefan Westberg – organ on Across the open sea

References

External links
 
 Unleashed band website

1993 albums
Unleashed (band) albums
Century Media Records albums